Martin Kevin Vaughan (5 June 1931 – October 2022) was an Australian stage, television and film actor and musician. He is best known for appearing in the film Phar Lap as trainer Harry Telford and the lead role in the award-winning 26-part 1976 television miniseries Power Without Glory.

Career 
Vaughan was born in Brisbane, Queensland, to a vaudeville comedian father in 1931. Moving to Sydney, New South Wales. at age 17, he was employed in a number of occupations including steam presser, tram conductor, postman, customs clerk and bassoon player. After taking theatre production classes, he landed his first stage role in 1963 when he was aged 32, and has never been out of work.

He moved into television in 1967. In 1975 he won the Hoyts Prize for Best Performance by an Actor at the AFI Awards, for his role of Australian prime minister Billy Hughes in Billy and Percy. This was a tied result with Jack Thompson's role in Sunday Too Far Away. His continuing interest in Billy Hughes led some years later to the revelation that Hughes's daughter Helen had died in childbirth in London; in 2004 he presented an ABC program on the story.

His big break came in 1976, when he was chosen to play the lead role of John West in the ABC's 26-part television adaptation of Frank Hardy's novel Power Without Glory. In 1977 he won the Logie Award for Most Popular Actor for this role. He has since appeared in such television programs as The Dismissal (1983 miniseries; as Senator Albert Field), Come In Spinner (1989–90 miniseries), Water Rats, Blue Heelers, All Saints, The Flying Doctors, Heartbreak High, Salem's Lot (2004 miniseries)  and headLand. His feature films include Picnic at Hanging Rock (1975), Letters from Poland (1978), We of the Never Never (1982), Phar Lap (1983), The Man Who Sued God (2001) and Australian Rules. He has also appeared in over 60 stage plays.

Later years 
Vaughan completed a Bachelor of Arts in Theatre and Film at the age of 63 at the University of New South Wales. He was mainly retired, but occasionally agreed to take part in theatre roles that interested him, such as "Brian" in The Seed.

Vaughan died in October 2022, aged 91.

Award and nominations

Filmography

References

External links 
 

1931 births
2022 deaths
20th-century Australian male actors
Male actors from Sydney
Australian male stage actors
Australian male television actors
Australian male film actors
Australian classical bassoonists
Best Actor AACTA Award winners
Logie Award winners
Musicians from Sydney